Home for Christmas is a 2014 holiday duet album by American singers/actors John Schneider and Tom Wopat. The pair's most notable previous collaboration was portraying Bo and Luke Duke in The Dukes of Hazzard TV series from 1979 – 1985.

Track listing

Charts

References

John Schneider (screen actor) albums
2014 Christmas albums
Christmas albums by American artists
Jazz Christmas albums
Vocal duet albums